Jim Bright may refer to:
 Jim Bright (psychologist)
 Jim Bright (American football)